Ee Dil Helide Nee Bekantha is a 2014 Kannada romance drama film directed by TM Srinivasa and produced by Sridhara S under the banner of Sai Krishna Enterprises. It stars Avinash Diwakar and Sri Sruthi.

Cast 
 Avinash Diwakar
 Sri Sruthi
 Shashank Bangalore

Music 

The soundtrack album of the film has been composed by Satish Aryan, who makes his debut as a music director with this. Lyrics of the songs have been penned by S Sridhara.

Track listing

References 

2014 films
2010s Kannada-language films
2014 romantic drama films
Indian romantic drama films